Grapevine trunk diseases (GTD) are the most destructive diseases of vineyards worldwide. Fungicides (such as sodium arsenite or 8-hydroxyquinoline, used to fight esca) with the potential to control GTD have been banned in Europe and there are no highly effective treatments available. Action to develop new strategies to fight these diseases are needed.

The following fungal species are responsible for grapevine trunk diseases:

 Botryosphaeria dothidea and other Botryosphaeria species, such as B. obtusa, B. parva and B. australis,
 Cylindrocarpon spp., Ilyonectria spp., Dactylonectria spp. and Campylocarpon spp. (cause of black foot disease)
 Diplodia seriata (cause of bot canker)
 Diplodia mutila (cause of Botryosphaeria dieback)
 Dothiorella iberica
 Dothiorella viticola
 Eutypa lata (cause of Eutypa dieback)
 Fomitiporia mediterranea (cause of esca)
 Lasiodiplodia theobromae (cause of Botryosphaeria dieback)
 Neofusicoccum australe
 Neofusicoccum luteum
 Neofusicoccom parvum
 Phaeoacremonium minimum  (cause of esca and Petri disease) and other Phaeoacremonium species
 Phaeomoniella chlamydospora (cause of esca and Petri disease)
 Sporocadus incarnatus and other Sporocadus species.

Also Inonotus, Diatrype  and Phaeoacremonium species.

References

External links 
 International Council on Grapevine Trunk Diseases (ICGTD)